Marcus Chambers (born November 3, 1994) is an American athlete who specializes in sprinting.

Born and raised in Tacoma, Washington, Chambers attended Foss High School.

Chambers, contracted by Nike, competes best as a 400 meters runner and has a fastest time of 44.92 seconds. In 2013 he won gold at the Pan American Junior Championships as a member of the 4 x 400 metres relay team. Receiving an athletics scholarship to the University of Oregon, Chambers was a two-time Pac-12 champion in the 400 meters and had a second-place finish in the 400 meters at the 2015 NCAA Outdoor Championships. He was on the gold medal-winning 4 x 400 metres relay team at the 2015 NACAC Championships which set a competition record time.

References

External links
Marcus Chambers at World Athletics

1994 births
Living people
American male sprinters
Sportspeople from Tacoma, Washington
Oregon Ducks men's track and field athletes
Pan American Games bronze medalists for the United States
Pan American Games medalists in athletics (track and field)
Athletes (track and field) at the 2015 Pan American Games
Medalists at the 2015 Pan American Games